Allami is a surname. Notable people with the surname include:

Khyam Allami (born 1981), British musician and musicologist of Iraqi origin
Moaid Allami, Iraqi journalist
Suaad Allami, Iraqi women's rights activist

See also
Fatima El Allami (born 1989), Moroccan tennis player